Zuideinde (English: south end) refers to a number of Dutch villages:

 Zuideinde, Langedijk, near Sint Pancras, North Holland
 Zuideinde, Overijssel, near Kampen
 Zuideinde, South Holland, near Nieuwkoop
 Zuideinde, Utrecht, near Breukelen
 Zuideinde, Zaanstad, near Assendelft, North Holland